Paradise is an unincorporated town and census-designated place (CDP) in Clark County, Nevada, United States, adjacent to the city of Las Vegas. It was formed on December 8, 1950. Its population was 191,238 at the 2020 census, making it the fifth most populous CDP in the United States; if it were an incorporated city, it would be the fifth largest in Nevada. As an unincorporated town, it is governed by the Clark County Commission with input from the Paradise Town Advisory Board.

Paradise contains Harry Reid International Airport, the University of Nevada, Las Vegas (UNLV), most of the Las Vegas Strip, and most of the tourist attractions in the Las Vegas area (excluding downtown).

History
The southern part of the Las Vegas Valley was referred to as Paradise Valley as early as 1910, owing to a high water table that made the land particularly fertile for farming. County commissioners established a Paradise school district in 1914.

In 1950, mayor Ernie Cragin of Las Vegas sought to annex the Las Vegas Strip, which was unincorporated territory, in order to expand the city's tax base to fund his ambitious building agenda and pay down the city's rising debt. A group of casino executives, led by Gus Greenbaum of the Flamingo, lobbied the county commissioners for town status, which would prevent the city from annexing the land without the commission's approval. The commission voted to create the unincorporated town of Paradise on December 8, 1950. The town board initially consisted of five casino managers, chaired by Greenbaum.

Months later, however, it was reported that county officials had determined that the town had not been properly established, because the petition for the town's formation had an insufficient number of signatures and because it had violated a state law forbidding formation of a town spanning multiple school districts. On August 20, 1951, county commissioners accepted petitions to create two new towns covering the area of the putative town. Town "A" of Paradise included the areas that lay within a Las Vegas school district, extending from the city limits to a point one mile south, while Town "B" included the areas within the Paradise school district.

In 1953, Town A was renamed as Winchester, and Town B became known simply as Paradise.

In 1975, Nevada enacted a law that would have incorporated Paradise (along with Sunrise Manor and Winchester) into the City of Las Vegas. Before it could take effect, however, the bill was struck down as unconstitutional by the Nevada Supreme Court.

Geography

The official town boundaries are bordered by Desert Inn Road to the north, Nellis Boulevard to the east, Sunset Road to the south and Decatur Boulevard to the west.  There is a southern finger between Bermuda Road and Eastern Avenue south to Silverado Ranch Boulevard.  South of Russell Road, the eastern border stair steps on a rough 45-degree angle toward the corner of Eastern and Robindale Road, and there is an additional finger surrounding Interstate 215 east to St. Rose Parkway.

Demographics

At the census of 2010, there were 223,167 people residing in Paradise. The racial makeup was 59.8% White, 8.9% African American, 0.8% Native American, 9.5% Asian, 1.0% Pacific Islander, and 5.5% from two or more races. Hispanic or Latino residents made up 31.2% of the population, and 46.3% of the population was non-Hispanic White.

As of the census of 2000, there were 186,070 people, 77,209 households, and 43,314 families residing in the CDP. The racial makeup of the CDP was 72.51% White, 6.59% African American, 0.77% Native American, 6.52% Asian, 0.59% Pacific Islander, 8.37% from other races, and 4.65% from two or more races. Hispanic or Latino of any race were 23.47% of the population.

There were 77,209 households, out of which 24.6% had children under the age of 18 living with them, 39.7% were married couples living together, 10.5% had a female householder with no husband present, and 43.9% were non-families. 31.9% of all households were made up of individuals, and 7.5% had someone living alone who was 65 years of age or older. The average household size was 2.39 and the average family size was 3.04.

In the CDP, the population was spread out, with 21.2% under the age of 18, 10.8% from 18 to 24, 33.3% from 25 to 44, 23.6% from 45 to 64, and 11.1% who were 65 years of age or older. The median age was 35 years. For every 100 females, there were 109.1 males. For every 100 females age 18 and over, there were 110.0 males.

The median income for a household in the CDP was $39,376, and the median income for a family was $46,578. Males had a median income of $31,412 versus $25,898 for females. The per capita income for the CDP was $21,258. 11.8% of the population and 8.1% of families were below the poverty line. 15.3% of those under the age of 18 and 7.6% of those 65 and older were living below the poverty line.

Culture

Akhob by James Turrell
Allegiant Stadium
The Art of Richard MacDonald
Bellagio Gallery of Fine Art
Bliss Dance
Chihuly Art Gallery
Las Vegas Little Theater
Las Vegas Philharmonic Orchestra
Martin Lawrence Galleries
Nevada Ballet Theatre
P3 Art Studio
National Atomic Testing Museum
Liberace Museum
Marjorie Barrick Museum of Art
T-Mobile Arena
MSG Sphere at The Venetian

Education
The Clark County School District serves Paradise, as well as the rest of Clark County. The township is home to the University of Nevada, Las Vegas.

Sports

Paradise is home to Las Vegas's three major league sports teams: the Vegas Golden Knights of the National Hockey League (NHL), which play at T-Mobile Arena, the Las Vegas Raiders of the National Football League (NFL) which play at Allegiant Stadium, and the Las Vegas Aces of the WNBA which play at Michelob Ultra Arena. Super Bowl LVIII in 2024 will be played at Allegiant Stadium.

As UNLV is located in Paradise, most of its various teams play in the township. The UNLV Rebels football program plays at Allegiant Stadium, and the Runnin' Rebels and Lady Rebels play at Thomas & Mack Center and in the Cox Pavilion respectively.

Also, since 2004, the Las Vegas Summer League, organized by the National Basketball Association (NBA), is played in the Thomas & Mack Center and in the Cox Pavilion.

Paradise will also become the home of the upcoming Las Vegas Grand Prix where the circuit will take place around the Las Vegas Strip. The grand prix will become take place in November 2023 as part of the 2023 Formula One World Championship.

See also

 Las Vegas Monorail
 Paradise (2013 film)

References

External links

 Paradise Town Advisory Board Homepage 

 
1950 establishments in Nevada
Census-designated places in Clark County, Nevada
Las Vegas Valley
Populated places established in 1950
Unincorporated towns in Nevada